Ludolf is a Germanic surname or given name. It is derived from two stems: Hlud meaning "fame" and olf meaning "wolf". An alternate spelling of the name is Ludolph. People with the name include:

 George Philipp Ludolf von Beckedorff (1778-1858), prominent Prussian Roman Catholic convert and parliamentarian

Surname
 Hiob Ludolf (1624-1704), German orientalist
 Julius Ludolf (1893–1947), SS officer and concentration camp commandant executed for war crimes

Given name
 Ludolf Backhuysen (1630-1708), Dutch painter
 Ludolf von Alvensleben (1844-1912), Prussian major general
 Ludolf von Alvensleben (1901-1970), Nazi official
 Ludolf Jakob von Alvensleben (1899-1953), Nazi official
 Gottfried Ludolf Camphausen (1803-1890), Prime Minister of Prussia
 Ludolf Nielsen (1876-1939), Danish composer, violinist, conductor, and pianist
 Ludolf von Krehl (1861-1937), German internist and physiologist

See also

 Ludolph
 Rudolph (disambiguation)

German masculine given names
German-language surnames